Xinfeng railway station is a railway station located in Xinfeng Township, Hsinchu County, Taiwan. It is located on the West Coast line and is operated by Taiwan Railways.

History
The railway station building was completed on 30 October 1893. Over the years, it had been renovated and rebuilt several times. Currently the old building is used as a Starbucks store.

Around the station
 Hsinchu Industrial Park
 Little Ding-Dong Science Theme Park

References

1893 establishments in Taiwan
Railway stations opened in 1893
Railway stations in Hsinchu County
Railway stations served by Taiwan Railways Administration